Eupithecia kostjuki is a moth in the family Geometridae. It is found in Kazakhstan (the Ala-Tau Mountains).

References

Moths described in 1989
kostjuki
Moths of Asia